The Heletz Railway (Mesilat Heletz) is a 20 km railway in southern Israel which connects the Railway to Beersheba from a point just south of Kiryat Gat to the Lod–Ashkelon railway near moshav Mavki'im. The track passes close to moshav Heletz, from which it derives its name.

History
The railway was constructed by Israel Railways in the early 1980s, to provide a shortcut for freight trains from southern Israel headed for the Port of Ashdod. Previously, such trains had to be routed through the Lod Railway Station in central Israel. The railway was once used for some limited passenger service, though today it is used by passenger trains only on an emergency basis—in instances when the Lod – Kiryat Gat section of the Railway to Beersheba is blocked.

Development
The Ashkelon-Beersheba railway which opened in 2015 to the south of the Heletz railway provides an alternate rail connection between the Railway to Beersheba and the Lod-Ashkelon railway.

Israel Railways has proposed a plan to extend the Heletz railway from Kiryat Gat to Tarqumiyah in the future as a means of providing a rail connection between the Gaza Strip and the southern West Bank.

Standard gauge railways in Israel